UbiA prenyltransferase domain-containing protein 1 (UBIAD1) also known as transitional epithelial response protein 1 (TERE1) is a protein that in humans is encoded by the UBIAD1 gene.

The enzyme is named for its canonical role in ubiquinone production. Recent evidence suggests that ubiad1 has enzymatic activity in the vitamin K pathway, a role in blood vessel development, and may be involved in oxidative stress pathways.

Clinical significance 
Mutations of the UBIAD1 gene cause Schnyder crystalline corneal dystrophy.>

References

Further reading